Reginald Thomas Wade was an English professional footballer who made over 180 appearances in the Football League for Aldershot. He also played league football for West Ham United.

Career statistics

Honours 
Ilford

 FA Amateur Cup: 1928–29

References 

English Football League players
English footballers
Isthmian League players
Clapton Orient F.C. wartime guest players
Millwall F.C. players
Association football fullbacks
People from Ilford
1907 births
Year of death missing
Barking F.C. players
Ilford F.C. players
West Ham United F.C. players
Aldershot F.C. players